The Swan 77 was designed by German Frers and built by Nautor's Swan and first launched in 1992.

References

External links
 Nautor Swan
 German Frers Official Website

Sailing yachts
Keelboats
1990s sailboat type designs
Sailboat types built by Nautor Swan
Sailboat type designs by Germán Frers